Hydroxycinnamic acids (hydroxycinnamates) are a class of aromatic acids or phenylpropanoids having a C6–C3 skeleton. These compounds are hydroxy derivatives of cinnamic acid.

In the category of phytochemicals that can be found in food, there are :
 α-Cyano-4-hydroxycinnamic acid 
 Caffeic acid – burdock, hawthorn, artichoke, pear, basil, thyme, oregano, apple
 Cichoric acid
 Cinnamic acid – aloe
 Chlorogenic acid – echinacea, strawberries, pineapple, coffee, sunflower, blueberries
 Diferulic acids
 Coumaric acid
 Ferulic acid (3-methoxy-4-hydroxycinnamic acid) – oats, rice, artichoke, orange, pineapple, apple, peanut
 Sinapinic acid (3,5-dimethoxy-4-hydroxycinnamic acid or sinapic acid)

Hydroxycinnamoyltartaric acids 
 Caftaric acid – grapes and wine, mainly the trans isomer
 Coutaric acid – grapes and wine, both trans and cis isomers
 Fertaric acid – grapes and wine, mainly the trans isomer

References